Appreneur is a portmanteau of entrepreneur and application software. An appreneur is specifically an entrepreneur who works in the mobile device application industry, as well as in the emerging micropayment economy .

Characteristics and behaviors
The first attribute is that being an appreneur is extremely niche specific. While entrepreneurs span all markets, industries and business models, appreneurs are 100% focused on the app industry.

Another key attribute is that appreneurship eschews conventional wisdom, which says that if you want to make a business profitable, the best way to go about doing this is to find a product with a very high profit margin and sell it at a premium to people who can afford it. With the appearance, and success, of the increasing micropayment economy, this premise is becoming increasingly outdated. Several very successful apps only cost 99 cents US or are free. That's hardly a premium-pricing model. The ease with which mobile apps are purchased is a strong contributing factor here. The end user does not need to input their payment information with each purchase, as in a traditional "brick and mortar" purchase. Instead, all that is required is an acknowledgement of the purchase, and the user's mobile device account is charged.

In the traditional offline world of selling products there is something known as "minimum viable product." This means making something smaller and cheaper, while still charging the same, or more. Appreneurs however come at this from a different angle–they focus on and embrace simplicity and less functionality. This is due to the fact that the most popular apps on the market are very nearly always those that are the single-function easiest to use apps available. People want apps that do one thing, and one thing only, does it quickly, easily and with some style. And that's it.

Another notable attribute worth mentioning is that the appreneur does not require the standard overhead and infrastructure that a traditional business requires. Embracing the leverage points of outsourcing, and distribution handled by the mobile device service providers, and appreneur can get an app on the market with little more than an idea and a marginal development fee. An increasing number of teenagers, and even pre-teens are launching successful careers as appreneurs. With the ease of farming out work that the internet increasingly provides, this career path is open to anyone, which is again a sharp contrast to the traditional entrepreneur model.

The Future 
The term appreneur is a very new one. As such, the characteristics of an appreneurial business person, and business, are evolving rapidly. The advent, explosion, of the application software industry shows no signs of being a short term phenomenon. Apps represent both a new market opportunity, and open new ways of doing business. Combined with the concepts of the micropayment economy, the barriers to entry, and sustainability, for this business model are low enough that nearly any person is qualified to try their hand at this market. In essence, these factors combine to allow for a "grass roots" counterpoint to the traditional business models forged during the industrial revolution. As such, it seems very unlikely that the appreneur model will do anything except grow.

References

Entrepreneurship